Here Comes Louis Smith is the debut album by American trumpeter Louis Smith recorded in 1958 and released on the Blue Note label. Originally recorded for the Transition label, the company went out of business shortly afterwards and before the recording could be released. The album masters were acquired by Blue Note's Alfred Lion.

Reception

The Allmusic review by Scott Yanow awarded the album 4½ stars and stated: "Louis Smith had a brilliant debut on this Blue Note album, his first of two before becoming a full-time teacher."

Track listing
All compositions by Louis Smith except as indicated
 "Tribute to Brownie" (Duke Pearson) - 6:38
 "Brill's Blues" - 8:22
 "Ande" - 6:42
 "Stardust" (Hoagy Carmichael) - 5:20
 "South Side" - 8:38
 "Val's Blues" - 6:37

Personnel
Louis Smith - trumpet
Cannonball Adderley (credited as "Buckshot La Funke") - alto saxophone (tracks 1-3, 5 & 6)
Tommy Flanagan (tracks 3, 4 & 6), Duke Jordan (tracks 1, 2 & 5) - piano
Doug Watkins - bass
Art Taylor - drums

References

Blue Note Records albums
Louis Smith (musician) albums
1958 debut albums
Albums recorded at Van Gelder Studio